Concetta is an Italian female given name. Notable people with the name include:

Concetta Tomei, American actress
Concetta Fierravanti-Wells, Australian politician
Concetta M. Tomaino, business woman
Concetta DiRusso, American scientist
Concetta Scaravaglione, American teacher
Concetta Benn, Australian social worker
Concetta Biagini, known as Isabella Biagini, Italian actress

Italian feminine given names